Breaking Curfew is the fourth studio album by the Canadian rock band Red Rider, released in 1984 (see 1984 in music). The album was recorded and mixed at Metalworks Studios and E.S.P. Studio in Toronto, Ontario and Startling Studios in England.

Breaking Curfew reached #137 on Billboard's 200 chart in 1984 assisted by the single "Young Thing, Wild Dreams (Rock Me)"  which hit #44 on the Canadian charts and #71 on Billboard's Hot 100 chart. "Breaking Curfew" also hit #93 in Canada.

Track listing

Personnel
 Tom Cochrane – lead vocals, guitars, keyboards
 Ken Greer – guitars, keyboards, backing vocals
 Rob Baker – drums, percussion
 Jeff Jones – bass guitar, backing vocals
 John Webster – keyboards

Additional personnel
 Steve Sexton – keyboards
 Earle Seymour – saxophone
 Rough Maids – backing vocals
 Norman Moore – art direction and design
 Beverly Parker – photography

References

External links
Lyrics

Red Rider albums
1984 albums
Capitol Records albums